Damn Right, Rebel Proud is the fourth studio album released by American country music artist Hank Williams III. It was released on October 21, 2008. The album was released in two separate versions, one being a censored release for major retailers, the other is uncensored (AKA the Parental Advisory version). The album was released through Curb's revived Sidewalk Records label. This is Hank III’s most successful album to date.

Critical reception

Jonathan Keefe of Slant Magazine wrote that despite coming across as "one-note" with repetitive imagery and posturing, he praised the album for continuing the Straight to Hell formula by fusing country music conventions within a metal and art-punk context, concluding that: "Damn Right Rebel Proud seethes with an energy and a perspective that's too often lacking today, and it reaffirms that it's far more than just his name that makes Williams one of the genre's most vital artists." PopMatters contributor Julie Thanki was critical of Hank's lack of "artistic growth" and covering familiar territory throughout the record but praised him for being passionate and profound when delivering the material, singling out "P.F.F." and "3 Shades of Black" as highlights, concluding that: "If you're angry, brokenhearted, under the influence of various substances, screwed over by both your woman and The Man, and you just spilled whiskey on your favorite Misfits t-shirt, Damn Right Rebel Proud is very possibly your perfect soundtrack."

Track listing
All songs written by Hank Williams III except where noted.

Personnel
Hank Williams III – acoustic guitar, electric guitar, drums, vocals, instrumentation
Joe Buck – stand-up bass
Chris Carmichael – fiddle
Charlie Cushman – banjo
Andy Gibson – Dobro
Donnie Herron – fiddle
Johnny Hiland – electric guitar 
Randy Kohrs – acoustic guitar, Dobro
Adam McOwen – fiddle, accordion
Shawn McWilliams – drums
Gary Sommers – fiddle
Marty Stuart – mandolin, electric guitar
Bob Wayne – bass, guitar, vocals

Technical personnel
Hank Williams III – engineer
Jim Lightman – engineer
Keith Neltner – design, illustrations
Jennifer Tzar – photography
Taylor Norrell – Brewmaster

Chart positions

References

2008 albums
Hank Williams III albums
Psychobilly albums
Sidewalk Records albums